Giovanni Boaga (February 28, 1902 – November 17, 1961) was an Italian mathematician and geodesy professor.

He was born in Trieste and died in Tripoli, Libya. His Gauss-Boaga Projection is the standard projection used in Italian topography by the Istituto Geografico Militare.

External links
Biography at SISM 

1902 births
1961 deaths
20th-century Italian mathematicians
People from Tripoli, Libya
Academic staff of the University of Pisa
Libyan people of Italian descent